Arie Gerrit van Vliet (18 March 1916 – 9 July 2001) was a Dutch sprint cyclist. Between 1934 and 1957, he won 13 medals at world championships, including four gold medals, and set several world records in sprint events, despite the interruption by World War II. He also won a gold medal in 1000 m time trial and a silver medal in the individual sprint at the 1936 Summer Olympics in Berlin. His Olympic sprint race was obstructed by the winner, German cyclist Toni Merkens, who was however not disqualified, but merely fined for 100 German marks.

See also
 List of Dutch Olympic cyclists

References

1916 births
2001 deaths
Dutch male cyclists
Olympic gold medalists for the Netherlands
Olympic silver medalists for the Netherlands
Cyclists at the 1936 Summer Olympics
Olympic cyclists of the Netherlands
People from Woerden
Olympic medalists in cycling
Medalists at the 1936 Summer Olympics
UCI Track Cycling World Champions (men)
Cyclists from Utrecht (province)
Dutch track cyclists
20th-century Dutch people
21st-century Dutch people